Keadeen Mountain at , is the 152nd–highest peak in Ireland on the Arderin scale, and the 184th–highest peak on the Vandeleur-Lynam scale. Keadeen is situated at the far southwestern end of the Wicklow Mountains range, separated from the large massif of Lugnaquilla on its own small isolated massif with Carrig Mountain ; it overlooks the Glen of Imaal from the south.

Naming
According to Irish academic Paul Tempan, "Keadeen" is also the name of a townland in the nearby parish of Kilranelagh. In Irish the peak was sometimes called  in full, which was a name derived from the native group who gave their name to the nearby Glen of Imaal.

History 

Bibliography

See also
Wicklow Way
Wicklow Mountains
Lists of mountains in Ireland
List of mountains of the British Isles by height
List of Marilyns in the British Isles
List of Hewitt mountains in England, Wales and Ireland

References

External links
MountainViews: The Irish Mountain Website, Keadeen Mountain
MountainViews: Irish Online Mountain Database
The Database of British and Irish Hills , the largest database of British Isles mountains ("DoBIH")
Hill Bagging UK & Ireland, the searchable interface for the DoBIH

Marilyns of Ireland
Mountains and hills of County Wicklow
Hewitts of Ireland
Mountains under 1000 metres